The following is a list of notable deaths in March 1992.

Entries for each day are listed alphabetically by surname. A typical entry lists information in the following sequence:
 Name, age, country of citizenship at birth, subsequent country of citizenship (if applicable), reason for notability, cause of death (if known), and reference.

March 1992

1
Marie Déa, 79, French actress, fire accident.
Pierre Maudru, 99, French screenwriter.
Howard Payne, 60, English Olympic track and field athlete.
Karlo Štajner, 90, Austrian-Yugoslav communist activist and Gulag survivor.

2
Scott Appleton, 50, American football player, heart failure.
Martin Camaj, 66, Albanian folklorist, linguist, and writer.
Robert Clatworthy, 80, American art director (Ship of Fools, Psycho, Guess Who's Coming to Dinner), Oscar winner (1966).
Sandy Dennis, 54, American actress (Who's Afraid of Virginia Woolf?, The Out of Towners, Any Wednesday), Oscar winner (1967), ovarian cancer.
Subimal Dutt, 88, Indian diplomat.
Ron Hardy, 33, American DJ and house music pioneer, AIDS-related illness.
Samuel Marx, 90, American film producer, screenwriter and book author.
Jackie Mudie, 61, Scottish footballer, cancer.
Adolfo Sarti, 63, Italian politician.

3
Robert Beatty, 82, Canadian-English actor (2001: A Space Odyssey, Where Eagles Dare, Labyrinth).
Laurent Henric, 86, French football player and coach.
Lella Lombardi, 50, Italian racing driver, liver cancer.
Dante Maggio, 83, Italian film actor.
Harley Parker, 76, Canadian artist and scholar.
Saara Ranin, 94, Finnish actress.
Sukumar Sen, 92, Indian linguist.
G. L. S. Shackle, 88, English economist.

4
Néstor Almendros, 61, Spanish cinematographer (Days of Heaven, Kramer vs. Kramer, Sophie's Choice), Oscar winner (1979), AIDS-related lymphoma.
Art Babbitt, 84, American animator (Snow White and the Seven Dwarfs, Fantasia, Dumbo), kidney failure.
Joseph Buttinger, 85, American politician.
Alabbas Iskandarov, 33, Azerbaijani soldier and war hero, killed in action.
Pare Lorentz, 86, American filmmaker, cancer.
Mary Osborne, 70, American guitarist, leukemia.
Larry Rosenthal, 81, American baseball player.
Sándor Veress, 85, Hungarian-Swiss composer.
Yevgeniy Yevstigneyev, 65, Soviet and Russian actor, heart attack.

5
Jam Sadiq Ali, 93, Pakistani politician.
Santos Balmori, 92, Spanish-Mexican painter.
Peter Hadland Davis, 73, British botanist.
Karin Hardt, 81, German actress, cerebral hemorrhage.
Giuseppe Olmo, 80, Italian road bicycle racer.
Eduardo Airaldi Rivarola, 70, Peruvian basketball player, coach, and referee.
Andy Samuel, 82, American child actor (Our Gang), cancer.
Sunder, 83, Indian film actor.
David Walker, 81, Scottish-Canadian novelist.

6
Elvia Allman, 87, American actress (The Beverly Hillbillies, Petticoat Junction, The Nutty Professor), pneumonia.
Alojz Benac, 77, Bosnian and Yugoslav archaeologist and historian.
Silviu Bindea, 79, Romanian football player and coach.
Léo Campion, 86, French actor and freemason.
Maria Helena Vieira da Silva, 83, Portuguese painter.
Ranjit Desai, 63, Indian marathi writer.
Hugh Gibb, 76, English drummer, father of the Bee Gees, internal bleeding.
Otto Klineberg, 92, Canadian-American psychologist, Parkinson's disease.
David Stone Martin, 78, American artist.
Erik Nordgren, 79, Swedish composer, arranger and bandleader.

7
Charles Claxton, 88, English anglican prelate.
Asaf Messerer, 88, Soviet ballet dancer and ballet teacher.
Gunnar Sträng, 85, American politician.
Hans Zeisel, 86, Austrian-American sociologist and legal scholar.

8
Red Callender, 76, American musician, thyroid cancer.
Paddy Coad, 71, Irish football player and manager.
Sherman Edwards, 82, American baseball player.
Pentti Papinaho, 65, Finnish sculptor.

9
Menachem Begin, 78, Israeli politician, prime minister (1977–1983), Nobel Prize recipient (1978), heart attack.
James Brooks, 85, American artist.
Monty Budwig, 62, American bassist.
Franco Margola, 83, Italian composer.
Keris Mas, 69, Malaysian writer, heart attack.
Felipe Turich, 93, Mexican actor, pneumonia.
Arthur Van De Vijver, 44, Belgian racing cyclist.

10
Krasimira Bogdanova, 42, Bulgarian basketball player.
Vladimir Ivković, 62, Yugoslav Olympic water polo player (1952, 1956).
Wilhelm Rudolf Mann, 97, German factory manager for IG Farben and Bayer during World War II.
Enrico Mollo, 78, Italian racing cyclist.
Helmut Reichmann, 50-51, German world champion glider pilot, mid-air collision.
Luis Usoz, 59, Spanish field hockey player.
Giorgos Zampetas, 67, Greek musician, bone cancer.

11
László Benedek, 87, Hungarian-American film director (The Wild One, Death of a Salesman, Port of New York).
Richard Brooks, 79, American film director and screenwriter (Cat on a Hot Tin Roof, Blackboard Jungle, Elmer Gantry), Oscar winner (1961), heart failure.
David Carroll, 41, American actor (Grand Hotel), pulmonary embolism.
Liu Geping, 87, Chinese communist revolutionary and politician.
Norm Hall, 65, American racecar driver.
Anton Ingolič, 85, Slovenian novelist.
Lily May Perry, 97, Canadian-American botanist.
Eddie Sadowski, 77, American basketball player.
Joaquín Satrústegui, 82, Spanish politician.

12
Girolamo Bortignon, 86, Italian prelate of the Roman Catholic Church.
Max Catto, 84, English playwright and novelist.
Aleksandyr Christow, 87, Bulgarian football player.
Harold Hobson, 87, English theatre critic.
Elgiz Karimov, 21, Azerbaijani soldier and war hero, killed in action.
Hans G. Kresse, 70, Dutch cartoonist (Eric de Noorman).
Heinz Kühn, 80, German politician.
Lucy M. Lewis, 94, Native American potter.
Salvatore Lima, 64, Italian politician and mafioso, murdered.
Phyllis Stanley, 77, British actress.
Aino Talvi, 83, Estonian actress and singer.

13
Frieda Fronmüller, 90, German lutheran church musician and composer.
Adolfo Odnoposoff, 75, Argentine cellist.
Irmã Dulce Pontes, 77, Brazilian Roman Catholic nun and philanthropist.
Osvaldo Reig, 62, Argentine biologist and paleontologist.
Donald W. Riegle, Sr., 74, American politician.

14
Bill Allum, 75, Canadian ice hockey player and coach.
Teymur Elchin, 67, Azerbaijani poet and publicist.
Ralph James, 67, American voice actor (Mork & Mindy, Spider-Man, The Plastic Man Comedy/Adventure Show).
Glenn Liebhardt, 81, American baseball player.
Steven Brian Pennell, 34, American convicted serial killer, execution by lethal injection.
Jean Poiret, 65, French actor and playwright, heart attack.
Barry Roseborough, 59, Canadian football player.
Alvin Schwartz, 64, American author and journalist, lymphoma.
Arthur Studenroth, 92, American Olympic cross country runner (1924).
Elfrida Vipont, 89, English writer of children's literature.

15
Pietro Bucalossi, 86, Italian physician and politician.
Helen Deutsch, 85, American screenwriter.
Allan Dick, 76, New Zealand politician.
Sergio Guerri, 86, Italian cardinal of the Roman Catholic Church.
Deane Montgomery, 82, American mathematician specializing in topology.
Rahi Masoom Raza, 64, Indian poet and writer and Bollywood lyricist.
Jaap van der Vecht, 85, Dutch entomologist and academic.

16
Jean Denis, 89, Belgian politician and writer.
Ron Howell, 56, Canadian football player.
Roger Lemelin, 72, Canadian writer, lung cancer.
Wang Renzhong, 75, Chinese political leader.
Yves Rocard, 88, French nuclear physicist.
Pyotr Shcherbakov, 62, Soviet film and theater actor.
Joschi Walter, 66, Austrian football player.

17
Jack Arnold, 75, American film director (Creature from the Black Lagoon, The Incredible Shrinking Man, It Came from Outer Space), arteriosclerosis.
Aat de Roos, 72, Dutch Olympic field hockey player (1936).
Manuel Ferreira, 74, Portuguese writer.
Gøril Havrevold, 77, Norwegian stage and film actress.
Franklin R. Levy, 43, American film producer (Homeward Bound: The Incredible Journey, My Stepmother Is an Alien, Nighthawks), pulmonary embolism.
Monika Mann, 81, German author.
László Orczán, 80, Hungarian Olympic cyclist (1936).
Grace Stafford, 88, American actress (voice of Woody Woodpecker), spinal cancer

18
Arnold Diamond, 76, English actor, traffic collision.
Harry Hubbick, 81, English football player.
Jack Kelsey, 62, Welsh football goalkeeper.
Mario Landi, 71, Italian director.
Antonio Molina, 64, Spanish flamenco dancer, singer and actor.

19
Cesare Danova, 66, Italian actor (Mean Streets, Cleopatra, Animal House), heart attack.
Franziska Donner, 91, First Lady of South Korea as wife of president Syngman Rhee.
Wayne Dumont, 77, American politician.
Michael Aloysius Feighan, 87, American politician.
Oscar Gugen, 82, British diver.
Marilyn Moore, 60, American jazz singer.
Ed Prentiss, 83, American radio actor.

20
George Whelan Anderson, Jr., 85,American admiral and diplomat.
Lina Bo Bardi, 77, Italian-Brazilian architect.
Georges Delerue, 67, French film composer (A Little Romance, Platoon, Julia), Oscar winner (1980), heart attack.
Ioannis Kakridis, 90, Greek classical scholar.
Armando Testa, 74, Italian graphic designer, cartoonist, animator and painter.

21
Safiyar Behbudov, 24, Azerbaijani officer and war hero, killed in action.
John Ireland, 78, Canadian actor (All the King's Men, Spartacus, Gunfight at the O.K. Corral), leukemia.
René König, 85, German sociologist.
John C. Sheehan, 76, American organic chemist.
Natalie Sleeth, 61, American composer, cancer.

22
Joe Cantada, 50, Filipino sportscaster, lung cancer.
Gruffydd Evans, Baron Evans of Claughton, 64, British solicitor and politician.
Arthur Cronquist, 73, American biologist and botanist.
Androkli Kostallari, 69, Albanian linguist and scholar.
Melissa Stribling, 65, Scottish actress (Dracula, The League of Gentlemen, Compact).

23
Jane Bernigau, 83, German SS Oberaufseherin before and during World War II
Gurdial Singh Dhillon, 76, Indian politician from the Indian National Congress party.
Friedrich Hayek, 92, Austrian economist, Nobel Prize recipient (1974).
Ron Lapointe, 42, Canadian ice hockey coach, kidney cancer.

24
Ryszard Białous, 77, Polish military figure.
James K. Dressel, 48, American politician, AIDS.
Albert Murray, 85, American painter.
François Vallier, 91, French cross-country skier and Olympian.
Naig Yusifov, 22, Azerbaijani soldier, killed in battle.

25
 David Archer, 63, British field hockey player
Howard Christie, 79, American film producer.
William Hoyt, 54, American politician, heart attack.
Jahangir Jahangirov, 70, Soviet and Azerbaijani composer, conductor and choirmaster.
Tahia Kazem, 72, First Lady of Egypt as wife of president Gamal Abdel Nasser.
William Sears, 80, American writer and television and radio personality.
Florence van Straten, 78, American atmospheric scientist, cancer.
Nancy Walker, 69, American actress (Rhoda, McMillan & Wife, True Colors), lung cancer.
Phillip Wilson, 50, American blues and jazz drummer, murdered.

26
Bruno Cassinari, 79, Italian painter and sculptor.
Elwood Driver, 70, American aviator.
Barbara Frum, 54, Canadian journalist, leukemia.
Nan Gindele, 81, American athlete and Olympian.
Arthur Lees, 84, English golfer.
Rihei Sano, 79, Japanese football player.

27
Gordon Adam, 76, American rower and Olympic champion.
Easley Blackwood, 88, American bridge player.
Anita Colby, 77, American actress.
Gerry Duggan, 81, Irish-Australian actor.
Lang Hancock, 82, Australian iron ore magnate.
Tom Kahn, 53, American trade union leader and civil right activist, AIDS.
Leueen MacGrath, 77, English actress, complications from a stroke.
Prem Nawas, 60, Indian actor and producer, train  accident.
Harald Sæverud, 94, Norwegian composer.
James E. Webb, 85, American federal official, Administrator of NASA (1961–1968), heart attack.

28
Ernie Caddel, 81, American gridiron football player.
Janne Furch, 76, German screenwriter.
Elisabeth Granneman, 61, Norwegian singer, songwriter, children's writer and actress.
Hari Ram Gupta, 90, Indian historian.
Wendell Mayes, 72, American screenwriter (Anatomy of a Murder, Von Ryan's Express, Death Wish), cancer.
Blackie Pitt, 67, American NASCAR racing driver, cancer.
Nikolaos Platon, 83, Greek archaeologist.
Maurice Teynac, 76, French actor.
Willard Tibbetts, 89, American Olympic runner (1924).

29
Christopher Hawkes, 86, English archaeologist.
William L. Hendricks, 87, United States Marine Corps officer and film producer.
Paul Henreid, 84, Austrian-American actor (Casablanca, Now, Voyager, Joan of Paris), complications from a stroke.
Fərhad Qəmbər oğlu Hümbətov, 23, Azerbaijani soldier and war hero, killed in action.
Archie Marshek, 90, American film editor.
John Spencer, 8th Earl Spencer, 68, English peer, courtier, and father of Diana, Princess of Wales, heart attack.
Cecil F. White, 91, American farmer and politician.
Eberhard Wächter, 62, Austrian baritone, heart attack.
Bashir Hussain Zaidi, 93, Indian politician.

30
Spirydion Albański, 84, Polish footballer.
Manolis Andronikos, 72, Greek archaeologist.
Luigi De Laurentiis, 75, Italian film producer.
Amédée Fournier, 80, French road bicycle racer.
Bert Grund, 72, German composer.
Gerhard Gustmann, 81, German Olympic rower (1936).
Harold LeVander, 81, American attorney and politician.
Winnie Shaw, 45, Scottish tennis player, brain cancer.

31
Pam Buchanan, 55, Australian politician.
Alfredo de Angelis, 79, Argentinian musician.
N. R. Pillai, 93, Indian civil servant.
Doug Roby, 94, American football player and Olympic Games official.
Zenon Różycki, 78, Polish basketball player.
Ken Silvestri, 75, American baseball player, coach and manager.

References 

1992-03
 03